Ropalce is a village in the municipality of Lipkovo, North Macedonia.

Demographics
As of the 2021 census, Ropalce had 1,212 residents with the following ethnic composition:
Albanians 1,173
Persons for whom data are taken from administrative sources 38
Others 1

According to the 2002 census, the village had a total of 1,373 inhabitants. Ethnic groups in the village include:
Albanians 1,355
Serbs 7 
Macedonians 1
Others 10

References

External links

Villages in Lipkovo Municipality
Albanian communities in North Macedonia